Bongani Mahlangu (born 12 June 1986) is a South African cricketer. He made his List A debut for Mpumalanga in the 2006–07 SAA Provincial Cup on 28 January 2007.

References

External links
 

1986 births
Living people
South African cricketers
Mpumalanga cricketers
Place of birth missing (living people)